April 17 - Eastern Orthodox liturgical calendar - April 19

All fixed commemorations below are observed on May 1 by Orthodox Churches on the Old Calendar.

For April 18th, Orthodox Churches on the Old Calendar commemorate the Saints listed on April 5.

Saints

 Martyrs Victor, Zoticus, Zeno, Acindynus, and Severian, of Nicomedia (c. 303)  (see also: April 20 - Greek)
 Martyr Sabbas the Goth (Sabbas Stratelates), at Buzau in Wallachia (372)  (see also: April 12 and April 15)
 Saint Acacius II, Bishop of Melitene (445)   (see also: April 17)
 Saint Cosmas, Bishop of Chalcedon, and his fellow-ascetic St. Auxentius (815-820)
 Venerable John the Righteous (John the Hesychast), disciple of St. Gregory of Decapolis (c. 820-850)
 Venerable Naucratius, Abbot of the Studion (848)
 Venerable Athanasia the Wonderworker, Abbess, of Aegina (850) (see also: April 12 - Slavic)
 Venerable Matthew (Matthias), acquaintance of St. Athanasia the Wonderworker (c. 850)
 Venerable Euthymius the Wonderworker.

Pre-Schism Western saints

 Saint Eleutherius, Bishop of Illyria, his mother Anthia, and eleven others, martyred in Illyria under Hadrian (c. 117-138)  (see also: December 15 - East)
 Martyr Corebus, a prefect of Messina in Sicily, converted to Christ by St Eleutherius and martyred under the Emperor Hadrian (c. 117-138)
 Martyr Calocerus, an officer of the Emperor Hadrian martyred in Brescia in Italy (c. 117-138)
 Saint Apollonius the Apologist, a Roman senator, denounced as a Christian by one of his own slaves and condemned to be beheaded (c. 190)
 Saints Bitheus and Genocus, two monks from Britain who accompanied St Finian of Clonard to Ireland (6th century)
 Saint Laserian (Molaisse), founder of the monastery and bishopric of Leighlin in Ireland (639)
 Saint Deicola (Dicul), born in Ireland, he preached Christ in England in Norfolk and in Sussex (late 7th century)
 Saint Agia (Aia, Aya, Austregildis, Aye), wife of St Hidulf of Hainault in Belgium, monastic at the convent of Mons (c. 714)
 Saint Wicterp (Wiho, Wicho), Abbot of Ellwangen Abbey in Germany, later became the tenth Bishop of Augsburg (749)
 Saint Cogitosus, a monk at Kildare in Ireland who probably wrote the Life of St Brigid (8th century)
 Saint Perfectus, a priest in Cordoba in Spain, martyred by Muslims on Easter Sunday (851)

Post-Schism Orthodox saints

 Venerable Basil (Ratishvili) the Georgian, Wonderworker, of Iveron Monastery, Mt. Athos (13th century)
 Venerable Euthymius the Enlightener of Karelia (1435), and righteous laymen Anthony and Felix of Karelia.
 New Martyr John the Tailor, of Ioannina, at Constantinople (1526)
 Venerable new martyr John (Koulikas) (1564)  (see also: April 8)
 Martyr Tunom, Arab Emir who confessed Christ on seeing the Holy Fire in Jerusalem (1579)
 Hieromartyr Cyril VI of Constantinople, Ecumenical Patriarch of Constantinople (1821)

New martyrs and confessors

 New Hieromartyr Bessarion Selinin, Priest (1918)
 New Hieromartyr Alexis Krontenkov, Priest, of Ekaterinburg (1930)
 New Hieromartyrs Nicholas (1937) and Basil Derzhavin (1930), Priests, and martyred lay people of the city of Gorodets, Nizhni-Novgorod.
 New Martyr Tamara (Satsi), Abbess, of Cheboksara (Chuvashia) (1942)

Other commemorations

 Icon of the Most Holy Theotokos "Glykophilousa" ("Sweet-kissing").  (see also: March 27)
 Icon of the Mother of God of St Maximus (Maximovsk Icon) (1299)

Icon gallery

Notes

References

Sources
 April 18 / May 1. Orthodox Calendar (PRAVOSLAVIE.RU).
 May 1 / April 18. HOLY TRINITY RUSSIAN ORTHODOX CHURCH (A parish of the Patriarchate of Moscow).
 April 18. OCA - The Lives of the Saints.
 The Autonomous Orthodox Metropolia of Western Europe and the Americas (ROCOR). St. Hilarion Calendar of Saints for the year of our Lord 2004. St. Hilarion Press (Austin, TX). p. 29.
 April 18. Latin Saints of the Orthodox Patriarchate of Rome.
 The Roman Martyrology. Transl. by the Archbishop of Baltimore. Last Edition, According to the Copy Printed at Rome in 1914. Revised Edition, with the Imprimatur of His Eminence Cardinal Gibbons. Baltimore: John Murphy Company, 1916. pp. 108–109.
 Rev. Richard Stanton. A Menology of England and Wales, or, Brief Memorials of the Ancient British and English Saints Arranged According to the Calendar, Together with the Martyrs of the 16th and 17th Centuries. London: Burns & Oates, 1892. p. 164.
Greek Sources
 Great Synaxaristes:  18 ΑΠΡΙΛΙΟΥ. ΜΕΓΑΣ ΣΥΝΑΞΑΡΙΣΤΗΣ.
  Συναξαριστής. 18 Απριλίου. ECCLESIA.GR. (H ΕΚΚΛΗΣΙΑ ΤΗΣ ΕΛΛΑΔΟΣ). 
Russian Sources
  1 мая (18 апреля). Православная Энциклопедия под редакцией Патриарха Московского и всея Руси Кирилла (электронная версия). (Orthodox Encyclopedia - Pravenc.ru).
  18 апреля (ст.ст.) 1 мая 2013 (нов. ст.). Русская Православная Церковь Отдел внешних церковных связей. (DECR).

April in the Eastern Orthodox calendar